Kevin Cahill (born November 5, 1955) is an American politician who had represented District 103 in the New York State Assembly. Cahill is a Democrat.

Cahill graduated from the State University of New York at New Paltz in 1977 with a BA in political science, and from Albany Law School in 1980. From 1981 to 1990, Cahill worked as an attorney, while also serving on the Ulster County Democratic Committee. He was an Ulster County legislator from 1986 through 1992, when he served as minority leader of the Ulster County Legislature. From 1993 to 1994 he served as the Assemblyman from the 101st district. 

After 1994, Cahill served as the director of a Medicare health care plan under contract with the Health Care Financing Administration. Cahill was elected again to the Assembly in 1998, and began his term in 1999.

He won each subsequent election for the Assembly until 2022, when he lost against Sarahana Shrestha in the Democratic Primary election on June 28, 2022 by less than 600 votes.

He is the current chairman of the Standing Committee on Insurance.  He previously served as chairman of the Standing Committee on Energy. He also serves on the Health, Higher Education, Ways and Means and Commerce and Industry Committees, among others. He served as the chairman of the Assembly Committee on Ethics and Guidance, co-chair of the Joint Legislative Ethics Commission, the Assembly Science and Technology Commission, Assembly spokesman for Community Corrections, part of the task force on Local Government Finance Reform and the chairman of the Legislative Task Force on People with Disabilities in the past.  His term in the New York State Assembly will conclude in 2022.

Personal life
Cahill has two adult children and lives in Kingston, New York.

References

External links
New York State Assembly Member Website

|-

|-

Democratic Party members of the New York State Assembly
Albany Law School alumni
State University of New York at New Paltz alumni
Living people
1955 births
Politicians from New York City
Politicians from Kingston, New York
21st-century American politicians